Captain Fantastic may refer to:

 Captain Fantastic (TV series), a 1967 British TV series
 Captain Fantastic (film), a 2016 American comedy-drama
 Captain Fantastic and the Brown Dirt Cowboy, a 1975 album by Elton John
 Captain Fantastic (album), a 2018 album by Die Fantastischen Vier
 Sunil Chhetri (born 1984), an Indian footballer